Erica Krauth (born 20 May 1981) is a retired Argentine female tennis player.

She has career-high WTA rankings of 229 in singles, achieved on 16 August 2004, and 103 in doubles, set on 11 October 2004. Krauth won two singles and 23 doubles titles on the ITF Women's Circuit.

She made her main-draw debut on the WTA Tour at the 2009 Swedish Open and 2009 Gastein Ladies in the doubles event partnering Hanna Nooni.

Krauth retired from professional tennis 2010.

ITF finals

Singles (2–3)

Doubles (23–19)

External links
 
 
 

1981 births
Living people
Argentine female tennis players
People from Luján, Buenos Aires
Sportspeople from Buenos Aires Province
20th-century Argentine women
21st-century Argentine women